Utricularia parthenopipes is a small annual carnivorous plant that belongs to the genus Utricularia and is endemic to the Brazilian state of Bahia. It was originally described and published by Peter Taylor in 1986.

See also 
 List of Utricularia species

References 

Carnivorous plants of South America
Flora of Brazil
parthenopipes